Religion in Ukraine is diverse, with a majority of the population adhering to some denomination of Christianity. A 2022 survey conducted by the Kyiv International Institute of Sociology (KIIS) reported that 85% of Ukrainians identify themselves as Christians. 72% of the population avowed fidelity to an Eastern Orthodox Church: 54% of Ukrainians proclaimed adherence to the autocephalous Orthodox Church of Ukraine; 14% identified as Orthodox Christian without specifying a church affiliation; 4% associated with the Moscow Patriarchate. Another 9% of Ukrainians professed devotion to the Catholic Church in Ukraine: 8% Ukrainian Greek Catholics and 1% Latin Catholics. 2% of the population declared affiliation to a mainstream Protestant Church, and a further 2% identified with some alternative sect of Christianity (such as Jehovah's Witnesses).

10% of Ukrainians identified as atheists. With Christianity in Ukraine overwhelmingly predominant, representative statistical samples of the population surveyed by KIIS in 2020, 2021, and 2022 reported 0% of respondents identifying with Judaism and Islam. An older survey by the Razumkov Center in 2018 estimated Jews in Ukraine at 0.4% of the population, with smaller 0.1% minorities following Hinduism, Buddhism and Paganism (Rodnovery). According to the surveys conducted by Razumkov in the 2000s and early 2010s, such proportions have remained relatively constant throughout the last decade, while the proportion of believers overall has decreased from 76% in 2014 to 70% in 2016 and 72% in 2018.

As of 2022, Christianity was particularly strong in westernmost Ukrainian regions, where most Greek Catholics lived. In central, southern and eastern regions, Christians constitute a smaller proportion of the total population, particularly low in the easternmost region of Donbas. Another religion that is present in Ukraine besides Christianity is Rodnovery (Slavic native faith), which comprises Ukrainian- and Russian-language communities (some Rodnover organizations call the religion , thus functioning in homonymy with Christian Orthodox churches).

Crimean Tatars professing Islam represent a significant part of the population in Crimea, which prior to 2014 was a subject of Ukraine, but has been since that year occupied by Russia. As of 2016, without Crimea, where Muslims formed 15% of the population in 2013, only Donbas maintains a larger community of Muslims compared to other Ukrainian regions (6%).

Since before the outbreak of the war in Donbas in 2014, but even more violently so from that year onward, there has been unrest between pro-Ukrainian and pro-Russian religious groups in the country.

After the 2022 Russian invasion of Ukraine, Ukraine President Volodymyr Zelenskyy "signed a decree enacting a National Security and Defense Council decision to impose personal sanctions against representatives of religious organizations associated with Russia". Ukraine's government will specifically examine the Ukrainian Orthodox Church of the Moscow Patriarchate and ban any activities relating to pro-Russian movement.

History

In pre-historic times and in the early Middle Ages, the territories of present-day Ukraine supported different tribes practising their traditional pagan religions (though note for example the Tengrism of Old Great Bulgaria in the Ukrainian lands in the 7th century CE). Byzantine-rite Christianity first became prominent about the turn of the first millennium. Later traditions and legends relate that in the first century CE the Apostle Andrew himself had visited the site where the city of Kyiv would later arise.

In the 10th century the emerging state of Kyivan Rus came increasingly under the cultural influence of the Byzantine Empire. The first recorded Rus' convert to Eastern Orthodoxy, the Princess Saint Olga, visited Constantinople in 945 or 957. In the 980s, according to tradition, Olga's grandson, Knyaz (Prince) Vladimir had his people baptised in the Dnieper River.

This began a long history of the dominance of  Eastern Orthodoxy in Ruthenia, a religious ascendancy that would later influence both Ukraine and Russia. Domination of Little Russia by Great Russia (from 1721) eventually led to the decline of Uniate Catholicism (officially founded in 1596) in the Ukrainian lands under Tsarist control.

Judaism has existed in the Ukrainian lands for approximately 2000 years: Jewish traders appeared in Greek colonies. After the 7th century Judaism influenced the neighbouring Khazar Khaganate. From the 13th century Ashkenazi Jewish presence in Ukraine increased significantly.  In the 18th century a new teaching of Judaism originated and became established in the Ukrainian lands – Hasidism.

The Golden Horde (which adopted Islam in 1313) and the Sunni Ottoman Empire (which conquered the Ukrainian littoral in the 1470s) brought Islam to their subject territories in present-day Ukraine. Crimean Tatars accepted Islam as the state religion (1313–1502) of the Golden Horde, and later ruled as vassals of the Ottoman Empire (until the late 18th century).

During the period of Soviet rule ( 1917–1991) the governing Soviet authorities officially promoted atheism and taught it in schools, while promoting various levels of persecution of religious believers and of their organizations. Only a small fraction of people remained official church-goers in that period, and the number of non-believers increased.

The 20th century saw schisms within Eastern Orthodoxy in Ukrainian territory.

Demographics
As of 2022, according to a survey by the Kyiv International Institute of Sociology (KIIS), 85% of Ukrainians identified as Christians. 72% identified themselves with Eastern Orthodoxy, 9% to the Catholic Church (8% Eastern-rite, 1% Latin-rite) and 4% adherents to some sect of Protestantism or other form of Christianity.

Approximately 3 in 5 Ukrainians (58%) reported affiliation with one of the major Eastern Orthodox Church bodies in Ukraine, while 14% identified as Orthodox Christians without specifying affiliation to a church patriarchate. A significant shift in Orthodox identity occurred in the wake of the February 2022 Russian invasion of Ukraine. The July 2022 KIIS survey found only 1 in 25 of Ukrainians (4%) identified with the Ukrainian Orthodox Church of the Moscow Patriarchate (UOC-MP), a considerable drop from nearly 1/5 (18%) in June 2021 and 15% in June 2020 recorded in the same KIIS polling in the preceding years. The decline was geographically uniform: UOC-MP peaked in Eastern Ukraine at 6%, only slightly above 3-5% reached elsewhere in the country. Likewise, among ethnic Ukrainians, there was little variance: 3% of Ukrainian-speakers, 4% of bilingual Ukrainians, and 6% of Russian-speakers identified with the UOC-MP; only rising to 13% among Russian-speaking ethnic Russians living in Ukraine.

Conversely, in 2022 more than half of Ukrainians (54%) identified with the autocephalous Orthodox Church of Ukraine (OCU), up from 42% in 2021 and 34% in 2020. OCU identification was most predominant in Central Ukraine (59%) and Southern Ukraine (57%). OCU affiliation included strong majorities of Ukrainian-speaking Ukrainians (58%) and bilingual Ukrainians (53%), but also encompassed significant minorities of Russian-speaking Ukrainians (46%) and Russian-speaking Russians (36%).

Consequent upon the sharp decline in UOC-MP affiliation, in 2022 the Catholic Church in Ukraine was the second-largest church body in the country, counting nearly 1 in 10 Ukrainians as adherents; the overwhelming majority members of the Ukrainian Greek Catholic Church. Catholics were heavily concentrated in Western Ukraine, where more than 1 in 4 Ukrainians (28%) identified with Catholicism, compared to only 1-2% elsewhere. Catholic identity was also highest (14%) among Ukrainian-speaking ethnic Ukrainians.

A 2018 survey conducted by the Razumkov Centre found that 71.7% of the total respondents declared to be believers, while 11.5% were uncertain whether they believed or not, 5.3% were uninterested in beliefs, 4.7% were unbelievers, 3.0% were atheists, and a further 3.7% found it difficult to answer the question.

About 67.3% of the population declared adherence to one or another strand of Orthodox Christianity (28.7% of the Kyiv Patriarchate, 23.4% just Orthodox, 12.8% of the Moscow Patriarchate, 0.3% Ukrainian Autocephalous Orthodox Church, and 1.9% other types of Orthodoxy), 7.7% just Christians, 9.4% Greek Rite Catholics, 2.2% Protestants and 0.8% Latin Rite Catholics. Judaism was the religion of 0.4%; while Buddhism, Paganism and Hinduism were each the religions of 0.1% of the population. A further 11.0% declared themselves non-religious or unaffiliated.

Among those Ukrainians who declared to believe in Orthodoxy, 42.6% declared to be members of the Ukrainian Orthodox Church of the Kyivan Patriarchate, while 19.0% declared to be members of the Ukrainian Orthodox Church of the Moscovian Patriarchate. A further 0.5% were members of the Ukrainian Autocephalous Orthodox Church. Among the remaining Orthodox Ukrainians, 34.7% declared to be "just Orthodox", without affiliation to any patriarchate, while a further 2.8% declared that they "did not know" which patriarchate or Orthodox church they belonged to.

Beliefs

Beliefs and religions

Religions by year

Religions by region

Religions by oblast
A February 2015 survey by Razumkov Centre, SOCIS, Rating and KIIS gave the following data at oblast level:

Types of Orthodoxy

Current religious denominations (2020-2022)

Denomination by region (2022)

Denomination by language and ethnicity (2022)

Christianity

As of 2022, 85% of the population of Ukraine professed belief in Christianity.

Eastern Orthodoxy
According to the same survey, 72% of the total population adhered to Orthodox Christianity. Orthodoxy comprises about three-quarters of the population in Eastern (74%), Central (76%), and Southern Ukraine (79%), whereas Orthodoxy makes up the lowest proportion of the population in Western Ukraine (59%).

From 1992 to 2018, there have been three Orthodox churches active in the independent Ukraine following the dissolution of the USSR: the Ukrainian Orthodox Church – Kyiv Patriarchate (UOC-KP), the Ukrainian Autocephalous Orthodox Church (UAOC) and the Ukrainian Orthodox Church (Moscow Patriarchate) (UOC-MP). The UAOC and the UOC-KP were not recognized by other Orthodox churches and were considered 'schismatic'.

On 11 October 2018, the excommunications of the UAOC and the UOC-KP were lifted by the Ecumenical Patriarchate, the Ecumenical Patriarchate also announced it would grant autocephaly to the Orthodox faithfuls in Ukraine. However, the Ecumenical Patriarchate recognized neither the UAOC nor the UOC-KP as legitimate and their leaders were not recognized as primates of their respective churches. The Ecumenical Patriarchate declared that it recognized the sacraments performed by the UOC-KP and the UAOC as valid.

On 15 December 2018, members of the Ukrainian Orthodox Church – Kyiv Patriarchate, the Ukrainian Autocephalous Orthodox Church, and parts of the Ukrainian Orthodox Church (Moscow Patriarchate), voted during an unification council through their representatives (bishops) to unite into the Orthodox Church of Ukraine on the basis of complete canonical independence. They elected their primate, Epiphanius, and adopted a charter for the Orthodox Church of Ukraine during the same unification council. On 5 January 2019, Ecumenical Patriarch Bartholomew and Metropolitan Epiphanius celebrated a Divine Liturgy in St. George's Cathedral in Istanbul; the tomos granting autocephaly to the Orthodox Church of Ukraine was signed thereafter, also in St. George's Cathedral.

On 27 May 2022, the Ukrainian Orthodox Church formally cut ties and declared independence from the Russian Orthodox Church.

Orthodox Church of Ukraine

The Orthodox Church of Ukraine (OCU) is recently formed national Orthodox Church from Unification council in December 2018, After mergers from Ukrainian Orthodox Church—Kyiv Patriarchate, Ukrainian Autocephalous Orthodox Church and parts of Ukrainian Orthodox Church (Moscow Patriarchate). The title of its primate is "His Beatitude (name), Metropolitan of Kyiv and all Ukraine". The church uses Ukrainian language as its liturgical language.

Ukrainian Orthodox Church 

Prior to 2022, the Ukrainian Orthodox Church (UOC) was a constituent part of the Russian Orthodox Church (the Moscow Patriarchate). The UOC, like most Orthodox churches in Eastern Europe, uses predominantly the Church Slavonic language in church services.

In the week following the creation of the Orthodox Church of Ukraine (OCU) on 15 December 2018 several parishes announced they would leave the UOC and join the new church. 

On 27 May 2022, the Ukrainian Orthodox Church formally cut ties and declared independence from the Russian Orthodox Church.

Other Orthodox Christian jurisdictions
There are also communities belonging to the Russian Orthodox Old-Rite Church and other Old Believers, to the Russian Orthodox Church Outside Russia, to the Ruthenian Orthodox Church, to various branches of the True Orthodox Church-Catacombism (including the Ruthenian True Orthodox Church, the Ukrainian True Orthodox Church and the Church of the Goths), to the Romanian Orthodox Church (Metropolis of Bessarabia), to the Ukrainian Autocephalous Orthodox Church Canonical, and to a variety of other minor Christian Orthodox churches.

Oriental Orthodoxy

Armenian Apostolic Church 

Adherents of Oriental Orthodox Christianity in Ukraine are mainly ethnic Armenians. Historical ties between peoples of Ukraine and Armenia have resulted in significant presence of Armenian diaspora in Ukraine throughout history and up to the modern times. Most of ethnic Armenians in Ukraine are adherents of the Armenian Apostolic Church, one of main churches of the Oriental Orthodoxy, distinctive from Eastern Orthodoxy in terms of particular miaphysite christology. In spite of those theological differences, relations between Armenian Apostolic Church and various Eastern Orthodox Churches in Ukraine are friendly. There is an Armenian eparchy (diocese) in Ukraine, centered in Armenian Cathedral of Lviv, and also there are many Armenian churches and other monuments on the territory of Ukraine.

Catholicism

Byzantine Rite Eastern Catholicism is the religion of 9% of the population of Ukraine as of 2022. This church is largely concentrated in Western Ukraine, where it gathers a significant proportion of the population (28%). Latin Church Catholics compose 1% of the population of Ukraine, mostly in western (2%) and central (1%) regions. Catholicism is largely absent in eastern Ukraine and non-existent in Donbas.

As of 2016, there are 4,733 registered Catholic churches, among which 3,799 belong to the Ukrainian and Ruthenian Greek Catholic Churches and 933 belong to the Latin Church.

Ukrainian Greek Catholic Church 

The Ukrainian Greek Catholic Church traditionally constituted the second largest group of believers after the Christian Orthodox churches. The Union of Brest formed the Church in 1596 to unify Eastern Orthodox and Catholic believers. Outlawed by the Soviet Union in 1946 and legalized in 1987, the church was for forty-three years the single largest banned religious community in the world. Major Archbishop Sviatoslav Shevchuk is the present head of the Ukrainian Greek Catholic Church. The church uses Ukrainian as its liturgical language.

Latin Church

The Latin Church is traditionally associated with historical pockets of citizens of Polish ancestry who lived mainly in the central and western regions. It uses the Polish, Latin, Ukrainian and Russian as liturgical languages.

Ruthenian Greek Catholic Church

Main concentrations of the Ruthenian Greek Catholic Church are in Trans-Carpathia near the Hungarian border. This community has multiple ties in Hungary, Slovakia and the United States.

Other Catholic groups
The Armenian Catholic Church has a very small presence. As of 2016, there is only one officially registered church belonging to Armenian Catholics.

Protestantism  

As of 2022, Protestants make up 2% of the population of Ukraine, with the strongest concentration in Western Ukraine (4%). In the country there are communities of Baptists, Pentecostals, Charismatics, Evangelicals as well as Lutherans, Presbyterians, and others. There is also a Sub-Carpathian Reformed Church with about 140,000 members, which is one of the earliest Protestant communities in the country. 

As of 2016, there are 2,973 Evangelical churches, 2,853 churches of the Baptists, 1,082 Seventh-day Adventist churches, 128 Calvinist churches, 79 Lutheran churches, 1,337 churches of Charismatic Christianity, and 1,347 other organizations belonging to the Protestant spectrum (including 928 Jehovah's Witnesses' halls and 44 Latter-day Saints congregations). In total, as of 2016, there are 9,799 registered Protestant groups in Ukraine.

Other denominations 

Jehovah's Witnesses claim to have 265,985 adherents, as reported in the movement's 2013 Yearbook. In 2010 the Church of Jesus Christ of Latter-day Saints  dedicated its Kyiv Ukraine Temple, and in 2012 claimed a membership more than 11,000 in 57 congregations in Ukraine.

Islam

Islam in Ukraine is the second largest religion after Christianity. Islam in the lands of Ukraine is hundreds of years old, it has a long and complicated history here.

Historically, there were two main ways of spreading Islam in Ukraine: the eastern (North Caucasus) and southern (Crimean Khanate and the Ottoman Empire).

Islam in Ukraine does not have any special specifics, it did not lead to the emergence of new trends, directions, groups, etc. Muslims in Ukraine always profess Sunnism.

As of 2016, Islam was the religion of 1.1% of the population of Ukraine. Muslims are mostly concentrated in Donbas, where they make up 6.0% of the population. In the same year, there are 229 registered Islamic organizations. In Crimea, which in 2014 was annexed by Russia, Crimean Tatar Muslims make up to 25% of the population. A major part of the south steppes of modern Ukraine at a certain period of time were inhabited by Turkic peoples, most of whom were Muslims since the fall of the Khazar Khanate.

The Crimean Tatars are the only indigenous Muslim ethnic group in the country. The Nogays, another Muslim group who lived in the steppes of southern Ukraine, emigrated to Ottoman Empire in the 18th–19th century. In addition, there are Muslim communities in all major Ukrainian cities representing Soviet-era migrants from Muslim backgrounds. There are approximately 150 mosques in Ukraine.

Most of Ukraine's Muslims are Crimean Tatars. Then there are Turks, Chechens, Azerbaijanis, Arabs, Pashtuns.

In Ukraine, there is the Spiritual Administration of the Muslims of Crimea (Crimean Tatars), the Spiritual Administration of the Muslims of Ukraine and the Religious Administration of Muslims of Ukraine "Ummah".

Judaism

The size of the Jewish population of Ukraine has varied over time. Jews are primarily an ethnicity, closely linked with the religion of Judaism. Jews in Ukraine are estimated to be between 100 and 300 thousands. However, ethnic Jews may be irreligious or practise other religions than Judaism. It is estimated than only 35–40% of the Jewish population of Ukraine is religious. Most observant Jews are believers of Orthodox Judaism, but there are as well communities of Chabad-Lubavitch and Reform Judaism, Conservative Judaism and Reconstructionist Judaism.

The biggest jewish communities are in Kyiv (Rabbi Jonathan Markovitch), Dnipro (Rabbi Shmuel Kamintski), and Odesa (Rabbi Avraham Wolf). 

Judaic congregations use Russian, Hebrew, Yiddish and Ukrainian languages. As of 2018, 0.4% of the population of Ukraine was found to be constituted by Jews believing in Judaism. There are, in the same year, 271 officially registered Jewish religious communities.

Buddhism 

Buddhism in Ukraine has existed since the 19th and 20th century, after immigration from countries with Buddhist populations, mainly North Vietnam and Korea under Communist period. Although sources are not readily available, Buddhists are believed to constitute 0.1% of the total population in Ukraine. At present, Ukraine is home to 58 formally registered Buddhist communities, but according to religious scientists there are probably 100 communities in Ukraine. The largest Buddhist communities in Ukraine belong to the Tibetan tradition. Most widespread are Karma Kagyu communities, of the Kagyu school.

Hinduism

Hinduism is a minority faith in Ukraine. The International Society for Krishna Consciousness managed to propagate the Hindu faith through their missionary activities. As of 2018, Hindu believers constituted 0.1% of the population of Ukraine, with a slightly higher proportion in Western Ukraine (0.2%). In 2016, there were 85 Hindu, Hindu-inspired and other Eastern religions-inspired organizations in the country, among which 42 are Krishna Consciousness congregations.

Paganism and native faith

Pagans 
The Slavic native faith (Rodnovery, Ukrainian: Рідновірство Ridnovirstvo, Рідновір'я Ridnovirya or Рiдна Вiра Ridna Vira; otherwise called Православ'я Pravoslavya—"Orthodoxy") is represented in Ukraine by numerous organizations. As of 2016 there are 138 registered communities divided between the Church of the Native Ukrainian National Faith (Рідна Українська Національна Віра, RUNVira)—72 churches, the Ancestral Fire of Native Orthodoxy (Родового Вогнища Рідної Православної Віри)—21 churches, the Church of the Ukrainian Gentiles (Церкви Українських Язичників)—7 churches, the Federation of Ukrainian Rodnovers (Об'єднання Рідновірів України)—6 churches, and other organizations—32 churches.

Lev Sylenko founded the Church of the Native Ukrainian National Faith (RUNVira) in 1966 in Chicago, United States, and only opened their first temple in the mother country of Ukraine after the breakup of the Soviet Union in 1991. The current headquarters of RUNVira is in Spring Glen, New York, United States. The doctrine of the Church of the Native Ukrainian National Faith, "Sylenkoism" or "Dazhbogism", is monist and centered around the god Dazhbog.

As of 2018, there were 0.1% Pagan believers in Ukraine, with a higher percentage in Central Ukraine. Sociologists estimated between 1,000 and 95,000 Rodnovers (0.2%) in Ukraine in the early 2000s.

Native places of power 
The most famous temple is located in Khortytsia in Zaporizhzhia. According to the beliefs of ancestors, the whole island is a sacred place that has a strong energy. There are still preserved idols and temples. Modern followers of the old faith often visit this place.

Other religions
As of 2016, there were 241 officially registered churches belonging to various new religious movements (including the aforementioned Hindu groups, the Bahá'í Faith, Jehovah's Witnesses), 58 registered Buddhist groups, and various registered churches for national minorities – including two Chinese Taoist churches and one Korean Methodist church, four Jewish Karaite kenas, eight churches for Christian Jews, and 35 churches of Messianic Judaism.

Ecumenism: All-Ukrainian Council of Churches and Religious Organizations
In December 1996, the All-Ukrainian Council of Churches and Religious Organizations was formed with the objective of uniting around 90–95% of religious communities of Ukraine. Since the end of 2003, the Council of Representatives of the Christian Churches of Ukraine exists in parallel to the council to promote the principles of Christianity in Ukraine and religious freedom. Affiliation with either or both of the assemblies is voluntary.

In 2007, the council accounted for representatives of 19 organizations, while in 2013, only 18. The Council of Christian Churches accounted for representatives from 9 churches.

Religious freedom 

Ukraine's laws guarantee the right of religious freedom, and provide a legal framework for the registration of religious groups. Some religious groups have reported difficulties in legally acquiring property (including property previously confiscated by the government of the Soviet Union) due to discriminatory treatment by local government bodies.

There are ongoing disputes of jurisdiction between the Ukrainian Orthodox Church – Kyiv Patriarchate and the Ukrainian Orthodox Church Moscow Patriarchate, which split as a consequence of the Russian military invasion of Ukrainian territory . Far-right Ukrainian nationalist groups such as Freedom have assaulted members of the Moscow Patriarchate and otherwise harassed them.

There have been several instances of violence against Jews in Ukraine since 2013.

Vandalism against religious buildings and monuments is common, with many different denominations affected. Jewish and Roman Catholic buildings were among the most targeted.

In territories not controlled by the government of Ukraine, Jehovah's Witnesses have faced persecution by Russian and separatist authorities. Russian media has also frequently denounced Jehovah's Witnesses and the Kyiv Patriarchate as being "pro-fascist".

On 2 December 2022, Ukrainian President Volodymyr Zelenskyy entered a bill to the Verkhovna Rada that would officially ban all activities of the Ukrainian Orthodox Church (Moscow Patriarchate) UOC in Ukraine.

Gallery

See also
History of Christianity in Ukraine
History of the Jews in Ukraine
Religion by country
Catholic Church in Ukraine
Protestantism in Ukraine
Ukrainian Bible Society
Islam in Ukraine

Notes

References

External links 
 Religious-Information Service of Ukraine

 
History of religion in Ukraine